Break Down is the second studio album by Mandopop boy group Super Junior-M. It was released online on January 7, 2013 by S.M. Entertainment and distributed by KMP Holdings. It is their first release in nearly 2 years, since the release of their 2011 EP, Perfection, and their first studio album in nearly 5 years, since the release of their first 2008 studio album, Me.

Background
After their second EP Perfection released in 2011, the Korean members returned to their activities as part of the main group, Super Junior. The main group released their 5th album Mr. Simple in 2011, in which Henry composed a song together with the leader Leeteuk, titled "Andante", for the repackaged version of the album, A-Cha. They also released their 6th album, Sexy, Free & Single, in 2012. Super Junior-M also performed at the main group's world tour Super Show 4. In 2012, Henry and Zhou Mi went on to act in a movie and a drama respectively. Henry was cast in the movie Final Recipe, alongside famous Malaysian actress Michelle Yeoh. Zhou Mi starred in the Chinese-Taiwanese drama When Love Walked In, alongside f(x)'s leader Victoria Song and Fahrenheit's Calvin Chen, as a main cast. In September 2012, it was revealed that Super Junior-M was preparing a comeback with a new album. At that time, the album was in preparation. Since this announcement, Super Junior-M participated in many concerts overseas in the latter half of 2012, including Taiwan, Malaysia and China as destinations. S.M. Entertainment revealed a promotional picture for the new lead single of Super Junior-M, "Break Down", announcing the comeback of the Chinese sub-unit to the Chinese music industry after nearly 2 years. Super Junior-M performed on December 31, 2012 at the 2013 Jiangsu Satellite New Year′s Eve Concert held in Jiangsu, China, and revealed for the first time the teaser for their new lead single "Break Down".

Composition

The lead single of the album, "Break Down", is described as an upbeat pop dance song, mixed with elements of dubstep and synth sounds. The song is produced and composed by Australian team Twice As Nice (consisting of Nick Audino & Lewis Hughes), Martin Mulholland and Nermin Harambasic from Dsign Music, while the lyrics are written by Zhou Weijie. It is a song about a man who can no longer hide his love for a woman, expressing his feelings to her. Nick Bass, who has worked with international stars such as Justin Timberlake, Janet Jackson, Beyoncé, Britney Spears, and Christina Aguilera, choreographed the dance for "Break Down". He was also the choreographer behind Super Junior's 2009 hit, "Sorry, Sorry". and also Bonamana in 2010.

For this album, Henry worked as a producer and composer with his production team Noize Bank, and collaborated with member Zhou Mi, who had already written songs for every album of Super Junior-M. Two songs were produced and composed by Noize Bank on this album, "Go" and "It's You", with the lyrics written by Zhou Mi. The track "Go" is described as an impressive song with a cheerful melody. The song expresses the feeling of falling in love, being confident and free about it. "It's You" is an energetic song with bubbly lyrics, a lively melody, and a medium tempo. The song "A-Oh!" is an electronic modern pop song.

Famous Malaysian singer and composer Michael Wong contributed to the album by composing a song for member Zhou Mi, called "Distant Embrace", while the lyrics are written by famous Hong Kong singer and actress Crystal Cheung. Super Junior-M requested a love song from Wong since the release of their first album Me, and sent him their profiles and songs, but he couldn't submit anything to them at that time. At first, he wanted to compose a song similar to the music of Taiwanese band Xiao Hu Dui, but they specifically requested a love song. The lyrics of "Distant Embrace" are about the faint pain of a love. The album contains R&B and ballad songs, including "Good Bye My Love" and "Tunnel". The song "Tunnel" was written by member Zhou Mi, and composed by Kenzie and Andrew Choi. It is a ballad with a dreamy sound.

"Stand Up", an upbeat track, will serve as the OST for upcoming Chinese movie Saving General Yang. Actors from the movie, including Adam Cheng, Vic Zhou, Ekin Cheng, Wu Chun, Li Chen, Raymond Lam, and Fu Xinbo, who play the roles of 7 brothers in the movie, will sing the Korean version of the song, against Super Junior-M who sing the Chinese version.

Track listing

Charts

Album charts

Chinese Version

Korean Version

Single chart
Chinese Version

Sales
Gaon Album Chart

Listicles

Release

References

2013 albums
Super Junior-M albums
Mandarin-language albums
SM Entertainment albums
KMP Holdings albums